The Neyyar River is 56 km long river which flows through the Thiruvananthapuram district of Kerala in India. It flows from the Agastya Mala (Agastyarkoodam) in the Western Ghats. The town Neyyattinkara in Thiruvananthapuram district, is situated on the banks of the river, is named after this river. The river flows through the Neyyar wildlife sanctuary and into the Neyyar resorvoir. It then flows towards the west though the towns of Kallikkad, Kattakkada, Ottashekharamangalam, Keezhattoor, Anavoor, Aruvipuram, Neyyantinkara and Thirupuram. The river then empties into the Arabian Sea at the Poovar estuary. Tributaries include the Kallar, Mullayar , and the Karavaliyar. It has several small canals along the river and the Neyyar Irrigation Project, "Neyyar Dam", is situated in this river. A safari park is located near the river. Neyyar river has been severely affected by sand mining.

The catchment area is mostly forested, command area is under mixed dry land crops such as coconut, tapioca, pepper, plantain, rice, etc.

References

Rivers of Thiruvananthapuram district